Bedfordshire has 141 Grade II* listed buildings.

Buildings

Bedford

|}

Central Bedfordshire

|}

Luton
Luton has no Grade II* listed buildings.

See also
 Grade I listed buildings in Bedfordshire

Notes

 
Lists of listed buildings in Bedfordshire